Glyphipterix madagascariensis is a moth in the family Glyphipterigidae. It is known from Madagascar.

The larvae feed on Kalanchoe species.

References

Glyphipterigidae
Moths of Madagascar
Moths of Africa
Moths described in 1951